Ruthie Blum is an American-Israeli journalist, columnist, former features editor of the Jerusalem Post, and current web editor at The Algemeiner Journal.

Blum is the daughter of Commentary editor Norman Podhoretz and Midge Decter.  She graduated from the Bronx High School of Science in 1976 and immigrated to Israel in 1977.

She has been described by left-wing journalist Craig Unger as “doyenne of the right-wing Bohemian set in Jerusalem.”

She was previously married to former Israel Broadcasting Authority News Editor-in-Chief Steve Leibowitz, during which time she lived in Har Adar, a suburb of Jerusalem. Blum has four children.

Published works
To Hell in a Handbasket: Carter, Obama, and the ‘Arab Spring’

References

Year of birth missing (living people)
Living people
Israeli journalists
Israeli women journalists
American people of Polish-Jewish descent
American women journalists
American Zionists
Jewish American journalists
21st-century American Jews
21st-century American women